Rafael Chaves (born January 11, 1968 in Isabela, Puerto Rico) is a former pitching coach of the Seattle Mariners in 2006 and 2007. Chaves was also the pitching coach for the Scranton/Wilkes-Barre Yankees, the New York Yankees' Triple A team. He was the Los Angeles Dodgers minor pitching coordinator from 2008-2013 and a special assistant for player personnel in 2014. On October 7, 2014, he was hired by the Philadelphia Phillies to become a pitching coordinator for them. He is currently pitching coach for the Rochester Red Wings, the Washington Nationals’ Triple A team. 

As a professional player, Chaves was signed as an undrafted free agent by the San Diego Padres in 1986. He pitched in the minor leagues until 1997, having spent time in the Baltimore Orioles, Florida Marlins, and Pittsburgh Pirates organizations.

Chaves resides in Orlando,Florida with his wife, Ivelisse Abreu, daughter Nicole Chaves and grandchild Diego Puig. On October 6, 2014 the Philadelphia Phillies announced Chaves was hired as their Minor League Pitching Coordinator.

External links
 Baseball Reference - Rafael Chaves Info

1968 births
Living people
Major League Baseball pitching coaches
Charleston Rainbows players
Riverside Red Wave players
Wichita Wranglers players
High Desert Mavericks players
Bowie Baysox players
Portland Sea Dogs players
Lynchburg Hillcats players
Augusta GreenJackets players
Carolina Mudcats players
People from Isabela, Puerto Rico
Puerto Rican baseball players
Seattle Mariners coaches